Appropriate Behavior is a British-produced comedy film set in New York City, which premiered on 18 January 2014 at the 2014 Sundance Film Festival. Written and directed by Desiree Akhavan, the film—Akhavan's feature directorial debut—stars Akhavan as Shirin, a bisexual Persian American woman in Brooklyn struggling to rebuild her life after breaking up with her girlfriend Maxine (Rebecca Henderson).

The film's cast also includes Scott Adsit, Halley Feiffer, Anh Duong, Hooman Majd, Arian Moayed and Aimee Mullins. The film had a theatrical release on 16 January 2015 in the US and was released on 6 March 2015 in the UK.

Plot

Brooklynite Shirin, the daughter of well-off Persian immigrants, is left homeless and jobless after her girlfriend Maxine breaks up with her. With the encouragement of her friend Crystal she moves in with strange roommates and gets a new job teaching 5 year old Park Slope children the art of movie making.

Shirin's parents are confused as to why Shirin moved out of her old apartment as Shirin has never told them that she's bisexual and dating a woman. Determined to get her life back on track, Shirin begins trying to follow Maxine, hoping to rekindle their relationship. Maxine begins dating Tibet, a fellow teacher at the Park Slope school where she works.  Shirin devotes herself to her work and comes out to her brother, who is mostly supportive, and her mother, who is in denial.

On the subway, Shirin tells Crystal that she again plans to bring up the issue of her sexuality with her mother in a month. She sees Maxine outside the subway car on the platform and the two women wave to one another.

Cast
Desiree Akhavan as Shirin
Scott Adsit as Ken
Rebecca Henderson as Maxine
Halley Feiffer as Crystal
Anh Duong as Nasrin
Hooman Majd as Mehrdad
Arian Moayed as Ali
Aimee Mullins as Sasha
Justine Cotsonas as Layli
Ryan Fitzsimmons as Brendan

Reception
Review aggregator Rotten Tomatoes reports a 95% approval rating based on 62 reviews, with an average rating of 7.2/10. The website's critics consensus reads: "Warm, funny, and quietly profound, Appropriate Behavior serves as a thoroughly compelling calling card for writer, director, and star Desiree Akhavan." On Metacritic, which assigns a weighted mean rating out of 100 reviews from film critics, the film holds an average score of '73', based on 19 reviews, indicating a 'generally favorable' response.

David Rooney in his review for The Hollywood Reporter praised the film by saying that "The promise of fresh cultural perspectives gives way to a more amorphous slice of contemporary romantic angst comedy." Ryan Gilbey wrote in the New Statesman that Akhavan is "a whiz (sic) at writing characters whose life seems to extend beyond their brief screentime." Katie Walsh of Indiewire gave the film a grade of B+, saying that "Funny, unique, and entirely inappropriate, Appropriate Behavior is a supremely satisfying and irreverent take on the New York rom-com."

Accolades

References

External links
 
 

2014 films
2014 comedy films
2014 independent films
2014 LGBT-related films
2014 directorial debut films
British comedy films
British LGBT-related films
LGBT-related comedy films
Bisexuality-related films
Female bisexuality in film
British films set in New York City
2010s English-language films
2010s British films